Sydenham railway station is located in the townland of Ballymisert in east Belfast, and is within walking distance of Belfast City Airport and Victoria Park. The station is unstaffed, and was opened on 1 November 1851.

Service

In the evenings, the service reduces to hourly operation.

On Sundays there is an hourly service in each direction.

References

External links

Railway stations in Belfast
Airport railway stations in the United Kingdom
Railway stations opened in 1851
Railway stations served by NI Railways
1851 establishments in Ireland
Railway stations in County Down
Railway stations in Northern Ireland opened in 1851